S. flava may refer to:
 Saonia flava, a marine bacterium from the genus of Saonia and the family of Flavobacteriaceae
 Sarracenia flava, the Yellow pitcher plant, a carnivorous plant species found from Alabama to South Carolina in the United States
 Suillia flava, a fly species found in Europe
 Sphingopyxis flava, a bacterial species from the genus of Sphingopyxis

See also 
 Flava (disambiguation)